Ramanathaswami Temple 
is a Hindu temple located at Tirukannapuram in the Tiruvarur district of Tamil Nadu, India. Dedicated to Shiva, the temple is located in the village of Tirukannapuram between Tiruvarur and Mayiladuthurai.
The historical name of the place is Ramanatheeswaram . The presiding deity is Shiva. He is called as Ramanathaswami. His consort is known as Sarivarkuzhali.

Significance 
The temple is associated with Rama who is believed to have worshipped Shiva at Tirukannapuram along with Rameswaram to absolve him of the sin of killing Ravana.

The temple has been praised by Sambandar in the Thevaram. The temple is frequented by people seeking relief from sins committed by them.

It is one of the shrines of the 275 Paadal Petra Sthalams - Shiva Sthalams.

References

External links

Gallery

Shiva temples in Tiruvarur district
Padal Petra Stalam